The men's 1500 metres event at the 2007 Pan American Games was held on July 25.

Results

References
Official results

1500
2007